The 1954 Massachusetts gubernatorial election was held on November 2, 1954.  Republican governor Christian Herter was re-elected, defeating Democrat Robert F. Murphy, Socialist Labor candidate Lawrence Gilfedder, and Prohibition candidate Guy S. Williams.

Democratic primary

Candidates 

 Francis E. Kelly, former Lieutenant Governor and Attorney General
 Robert F. Murphy, State Representative from Malden and Minority Leader of the House of Representatives

Results

General election

Results

See also 
 1953–1954 Massachusetts legislature

References

1954
Gubernatorial
1954 United States gubernatorial elections
November 1954 events in the United States